This is the discography for British musician/singer-songwriter David Sylvian as a solo artist. For information about the discography of Japan, see Japan discography.

Albums

Studio albums

Collaborative albums

With Holger Czukay 

Notes

With Russell Mills

With Robert Fripp

With Nine Horses

With Jan Bang, Erik Honoré, Arve Henriksen and Sidsel Endresen

With Stephan Mathieu

With Rhodri Davies and Mark Wastell

Compilation albums

Remix albums

Box sets

EPs

Singles

Videos

Video albums

Music videos

Contributions

References 

Discographies of British artists
Pop music discographies
Rock music discographies